Method Man & Redman (also referred to as Meth & Red, Red & Mef, John Blaze and Funk Doc or Funk Doctor Spock and Johnny Blaze) are an American hip hop duo, composed of East Coast rappers  Method Man (of Wu-Tang Clan) and Redman (of Def Squad). They are signed to Def Jam Recordings both as solo artists and as a duo. While they had been collaborating since 1994, it was not until 1999 that they released a full-length collaborative effort, Blackout!. The follow-up album, Blackout! 2, was released in 2009.

Method Man often gives a shout out to Redman on tracks that do not feature Redman; this usually comes in the form of "What up, Doc!" referring to Redman's alias "Funk Doctor Spock". In 2001, they starred alongside each other in the stoner film How High. In 2004, the duo also starred in a short-lived Fox sitcom, titled Method & Red, however they later disowned the series due to lack of creative control.

History 
The duo have known each other for a long time before signing with Def Jam. While at Def Jam, they reunited in 1994 on tour and met again in 1995 in the recording studio of West Coast hip hop legend Tupac "2Pac" Shakur. They recorded "Got My Mind Made Up" for Shakur's multi-platinum album All Eyez on Me (1996). After this they had friendly battles freestyling with each other on Yo! MTV Raps, which ultimately led to their collaborative debut single "How High". In 1999, the two rappers appeared together on "Rap Phenomenon" from The Notorious B.I.G. posthumous album Born Again.
 
On May 7, 2009, in promotion for their second studio album, Method Man & Redman released a mixtape titled Lights Out, which was hosted by DJ Green Lantern. In 2013, Method Man and Redman previewed a new track called "Lookin’ Fly Too" featuring Ehikmostz.

Discography

Studio albums

Soundtracks

Mixtapes

Singles

As featured artist

Appearances together 

 1994: Buddha Brotherz Freestyle
 1994: Freestyle
 1995: Double Deuces (St. Ide's Malt Liquor Commercial)
 1995: "Tonight's Da Night Freestyle"
 1995: Yo! MTV Raps (Last Episode Freestyle) (with Craig Mack, Large Pro, & Special Ed)
 1996: Funk Flex Freestyle
 1999: "Redman Freestyle" from Drunken Master's Drunken Style
 2000: "Rap City Freestyle" (Feat. Big Tigger)
 2003: Brownsugar Freestyle
 2004: "Method & Red TV Show Theme Song"
 2004: "Pixie Rap" from the TV show The Fairly OddParents, special School's Out! The Musical as the rapping voices of Head Pixie and Sanderson respectively.
 2008: "Broken Language 2008"

See also
Method Man discography
Redman discography
East Coast hip hop

References

External links
 
 
 
 

African-American musical groups
American hip hop groups
Def Jam Recordings artists
East Coast hip hop groups
Musical groups established in 1994
Musical groups from Staten Island
American musical duos
Hip hop duos
Wu-Tang Clan affiliates
Hardcore hip hop groups
Hip hop supergroups
1994 establishments in New York City